Kannan M. Moudgalya (born 21 March 1958) is an Indian professor of Chemical Engineering, Systems and Control, and Education Technology at IIT Bombay.

Education 
Kannan earned his Bachelor of Technology degree in chemical engineering from Indian Institute of Technology Madras with distinction in 1980 and  master's degree in electrical engineering from Rice University, Houston in 1985. He received his doctoral degree on same year in chemical engineering from Rice University, Houston.

Research career and spoken tutorials 
Kannan M. Moudgalya is a professor of chemical engineering, systems and control, and educational technology at IIT Bombay. He was a visiting professor at the University of Alberta.

He has held the posts of associate dean (R&D), head of Application Software Cell and head of the Centre for Distance Engineering Education Programme, at IIT Bombay. He is a member of the Standing Committee of the National Mission on Education through ICT, MHRD, Government of India. He is a life member of International Society for Technology in Education and Computer Society of India, and a member of IEEE.

He has also written two textbooks: (1) Digital Control, pub-lished by John Wiley & Sons, Chichester and (2) Optimization: theory and practice, jointly with Prof. Mohan C. Joshi, published by Narosa, New Delhi. He has published a large number of papers in refereed international journals and conferences in the areas of mathematical modelling, control and simulation.

He is notoriously known for his rigorous instructorship in the Design Project course at the Indian Institute of Technology, Bombay, which has inspired many startups.

Fellowships and awards 
Moudgalya has been awarded as "Pt. Deen Dayal Upadhyaya Recognition for Re-Engineering India 2020" in the Farmer Welfare/Industry/Institutional Category for having paved the path for multi lingualism by envisaging and curating spoken tutorials in various Indian languages for education, employment and empowerment.

The Spoken Tutorial project received Reimagine Education Award in 2015, by coming first in Nurturing Employability category sponsored by QS and Wharton School. He has also received Google MOOCs Research Award for Extending the Offline Capability of Spoken Tutorial Methodology in 2015.

References

External links 

 Spoken Tutorials 
 Distance Engineering Education Programme
 Digital Control - A book by Prof. Kannan M. Moudgalya 
 Prof. Mohan C. Joshi - Co-author of book Optimization: theory and practice 
Pt. Deen Dayal Upadhyaya Recognition for Re-Engineering India 
 

Living people
Academic staff of IIT Bombay
Rice University alumni
Scientists from Chennai
1958 births
Indian chemical engineers